The cours Saint-Louis is a street in Marseille, named after Louis of Toulouse (elder brother of Robert of Naples) rather than Saint Louis. It is the location of small pavilions to designs by Pascal Coste from which flowers are sold.

Located just off a cross roads, with the route to Place Castellane (via Rue de Rome) leading off from one side, the route to Porte d'Aix and its triumphal arch, completed in 1839 (the route also passes near the library Bibliothèque de L’Alcazar) leading off from the opposite side, two routes leading towards the Old Port (one of which being the famous La Canebière built in 1666 by Louis XIV of France), a route towards Palais Longchamp (with a simple right turn onto the Canebèire), its close proximity to the famous daily vegetable market place of Noailles and an also with an opening at the back, which meets up with the beginning of the Rue d'Aubagne (which leads up to Notre Dame du Mont), Cours Saint-Louis forms a kind of unofficial central point both geographically and culturally of Marseille town centre itself.

Apart from being in itself a historic place, it also features a few notable institutions such as the famous hat shop (La Chapellerie de Marseille), Toinou Coquillages, (A Sea Food and Shellfish restaurant established in 1956, highly respected by the people of Marseille), as well as the herbal Chemist shop La Pharmacie du Père Blaize, (established in 1815), being just a few steps away in nearby rue Méolan.

Cours Saint-Louis is now easily accessible by a new section Tramway which runs directly through it.

Streets in Marseille